The Chilean National Time Trial Championships is a cycling race where the Chilean cyclists compete to decide who will become the champion for the year to come in the time trial discipline.

Men

Elite

U23

Women

See also
Chilean National Road Race Championships
National Road Cycling Championships

References

National road cycling championships
Cycle races in Chile